Steven Otto (December 25, 1921 – January 16, 1989) was a Canadian politician.

Born in Poland, Otto was a businessman and lawyer before being elected to the House of Commons of Canada for the riding of York East in the 1962 federal election. A Liberal, he was re-elected in 1963, 1965, and 1968. From 1971 to 1972 he was the Parliamentary Secretary to the Minister of Supply and Services. He was defeated in the 1972 election.

On January 16, 1989, Otto's fourteen-metre sailboat, the Optimistra, hit a rock and capsized off the southeast coast of Cuba. He was presumed to have drowned and his body was never recovered.

References

External links
 

1921 births
1989 deaths
Boating accident deaths
Liberal Party of Canada MPs
Members of the House of Commons of Canada from Ontario
Polish emigrants to Canada